The 11th ACTRA Awards were presented on May 12, 1982. The ceremony was hosted by Jim Carrey and Dixie Seatle.

The Canadian Broadcasting Corporation, as the broadcaster of the ceremony, had originally proposed Dan Aykroyd as host, but he was rejected by ACTRA on the grounds that he was working in the United States and not an active ACTRA member.

Television

Radio

Journalism and special awards

References

ACTRA
ACTRA
ACTRA Awards